Palm Desert is a city in Riverside County, California, United States, in the Coachella Valley, approximately  east of Palm Springs,  northeast of San Diego and  east of Los Angeles. The population was 48,445 at the 2010 census. The city has been one of the state's fastest growing since 1980, when its population was 11,801.

A major center of growth in the Coachella Valley, Palm Desert is a popular retreat for "snowbirds" from colder climates (the Eastern and Northern United States, and Canada), who swell its population by an estimated 31,000 each winter. Palm Desert has seen more residents become "full-timers", mainly from the coasts and urban centers of California, who have come for both affordable and high-valued homes.

History

The ancestral homeland of Cahuilla, a division of the Morongo Band of Mission Indians. Their bird songs and funeral songs share the oral tradition of how they were present on these lands for over 10,000 years. 

The area was first known as the Old MacDonald Ranch, but the name changed to Palm Village in the 1920s when date palms were planted. Local historians said the main residents of pre-1950 Palm Desert were Cahuilla Indian farmers of the now extinct San Cayetano tribe, but a few members of the Montoya family of Cahuilla/Spanish descent were prominent leaders in civic life.

The first residential development occurred in 1943 in connection with an Army maintenance camp in the area. That site was later developed into "El Paseo", an upscale shopping district not unlike Rodeo Drive. In 1948, the Palm Desert Corporation began to develop real estate, and in 1951 the area was given its present name.

Geography

Palm Desert is located in the Coachella Valley, the north-western extension of the Sonoran Desert.

Sun City Palm Desert, California lies on the northern side of Interstate 10 from Palm Desert itself, but is unincorporated and not part of the City of Palm Desert (the original name was Sun City Palm Springs from 1991 to 1996).

Climate
The climate of the Coachella Valley is influenced by the surrounding geography. High mountain ranges on three sides and a south-sloping valley floor all contribute to its year-round warm climate, having among the warmest winters in the western United States. Under  of annual precipitation are average, with over 348 days of sunshine per year. The mean annual temperature at  makes Palm Desert one of the warmest places in the United States.

The surrounding mountains create a thermal belt in the southern foothills of Palm Desert, leading to a micro-climate with significantly warmer night-time temperatures during the winter months. The University of California maintains weather stations located in this thermal belt as part of their ecological project in the Philip L. Boyd Deep Canyon Desert Research Center.

Demographics

2010
The 2010 United States Census reported that Palm Desert had a population of 48,445. The racial makeup of Palm Desert was 39,957 (82.5%) White (70.4% Non-Hispanic White), 875 (1.8%) African American, 249 (0.5%) Native American, 1,647 (3.4%) Asian, 55 (0.1%) Pacific Islander, 4,427 (9.1%) from other races, and 1,235 (2.5%) from two or more races. There were 11,038 residents of Hispanic or Latino origin (22.8%).

The Census reported that 48,137 people (99.4% of the population) lived in households, 98 (0.2%) lived in non-institutionalized group quarters, and 210 (0.4%) were institutionalized.

There were 23,117 households, out of which 4,253 (18.4%) had children under the age of 18 living in them, 10,253 (44.4%) were opposite-sex married couples living together, 2,177 (9.4%) had a female householder with no husband present, 811 (3.5%) had a male householder with no wife present. There were 1,227 (5.3%) unmarried opposite-sex partnerships, and 373 (1.6%) same-sex married couples or partnerships. 7,948 households (34.4%) were made up of individuals, and 4,370 (18.9%) had someone living alone who was 65 years of age or older. The average household size was 2.08. There were 13,241 families (57.3% of all households); the average family size was 2.65.

The population was spread out, with 7,534 people (15.6%) under the age of 18, 3,333 people (6.9%) aged 18 to 24, 8,731 people (18.0%) aged 25 to 44, 12,924 people (26.7%) aged 45 to 64, and 15,923 people (32.9%) who were 65 years of age or older. The median age was 53.0 years. For every 100 females, there were 88.7 males. For every 100 females age 18 and over, there were 86.4 males.

The homeowner vacancy rate was 5.0%; the rental vacancy rate was 16.8%. 30,667 people (63.3% of the population) lived in owner-occupied housing units and 17,470 people (36.1%) lived in rental housing units.

According to the 2010 United States Census, Palm Desert had a median household income of $53,456, with 9.2% of the population living below the federal poverty line.

2000
According to the 2000 United States Census of 2000, there were 41,155 people, 19,184 households, and 11,414 families residing in the city. The racial makeup of the city was 86.8% White, 1.2% African American, 0.5% Native American, 2.6% Asian, 0.1% Pacific Islander, 6.5% from other races, and 2.4% from two or more races. Hispanic or Latino of any race were 17.1% of the population.

There are 19,184 households in Palm Desert, out of which 18.9% had children under the age of 18 living with them, 48.5% were married couples living together, 7.7% had a female householder with no husband present, and 40.5% were non-families. 32.4% of all households were made up of individuals, and 15.2% had someone living alone who was 65 years of age or older. The average household size was 2.1 and the average family size was 2.7. The demographics of Palm Desert shows a rising population of children and young adults.

The age distribution of the population was 17.3% under the age of 18, 6.2% from 18 to 24, 22.7% from 25 to 44, 26.3% from 45 to 64, and 27.6% who were 65 years of age or older. The median age was 48 years.

The median income for a household in the city was $48,000 and the median income for a family was $58,183. Males had a median income of $42,257 versus $32,202 for females. The per capita income for the city was $33,463. About 5.9% of families and 9.2% of the population were below the poverty line, including 12.1% of those under age 18 and 4.3% of those age 65 or over.

Economy

Top employers
According to the City's 2019 Comprehensive Annual Financial Report, the top employers in the city are:

Sports
 College of the Desert Roadrunners in football, baseball, basketball, soccer and volleyball.
 Golf – Palm Desert is home to about 30 golf courses.
 Tennis – tennis courts in the Marrakesh and Shadow Mountain golf clubs.

Resorts and golf clubs

The city's first golf course and tennis club was Shadow Mountain in 1952, followed by Marrakesh in 1954, the Palm Desert Greens mobile home park golf course in 1961, and the Palm Desert Country Club in 1962. The total number of golf clubs (more than 30 located within  from the city) have made Palm Desert known as the "World's Golf Capital."

Desert Willow Golf Resort is the City Of Palm Desert's municipal golf course, and has two championship courses: Mountain View and Firecliff. It is associated with the Westin Desert Willow Resort at the golf course location. The Firecliff course is listed at No. 13 in Golf Magazine's 'Best Courses you can Play' 2010 list for California.

In the late-1970s and 1980s, a spate of private golf clubs, destination resorts and hotels appeared in the northern half of Palm Desert, such as the four-star JW Marriott Desert Springs Golf Resort and Spa in 1987 and the four-star Desert Willow Golf Resort in 2002. The city has over 30 motels and 5,000 motel rooms, since lodging and hospitality is a major portion of the local tourist-based economy.

Government
Palm Desert was incorporated as a city in 1973 and designated a charter city in 1997. It operates on a council-manager form of government. Residents of Palm Desert elect five non-partisan council members who serve four-year staggered terms, with elections occurring every two years. Currently the Palm Desert city council is elected through Single transferable voting (proportional ranked-choice voting). The position of mayor is non-elected and rotates annually among the members of the city council. The council serves to pass ordinances, approve budgets, and hire the city manager and city attorney. The city manager oversees administrative operations and the appointment of department heads.

Public safety
The Riverside County Sheriff's Department has a station located in Palm Desert which provides police services to the municipalities of Palm Desert, Rancho Mirage, and Indian Wells, as well as the surrounding unincorporated areas.

The city of Palm Desert contracts for fire and paramedic services with the Riverside County Fire Department through a cooperative agreement with CAL FIRE. Palm Desert currently has three fire stations, which are Station 33, (Town Center), Station 67 (Mesa View), and Station 71 (North Palm Desert). Each fire station provides an engine company and a paramedic ambulance. Fire station 33 also has a truck company.

Education
Palm Desert is the home of the Living Desert Zoo and Gardens, a combination zoo and botanical garden featuring an extensive collection of desert plants and animals and a state-of-the-art animal hospital.

Palm Desert is also the site of the main campus of College of the Desert, the local community college, which has expanded greatly in size since the campus opened in 1961 and one of the buildings was built by donations from the local Cahuilla Indian tribal nations. The state higher education system opened an extension campus duplex (the Indian Wells Education Center for both California State University, San Bernardino and the University of California Riverside.

The primary high school is Palm Desert High School (with 2200 students) which is part of the Desert Sands Unified School District. The main Middle School (with 1100 students) is Palm Desert Middle School, a charter school. The four elementary schools in the city are: George Washington Charter, Abraham Lincoln, Jimmy Carter and Ronald Reagan. The northernmost part of Palm Desert is served by the Palm Springs Unified School District, so the students can attend Rancho Mirage High School in Rancho Mirage, or Nellie Coffman Middle School and Cathedral City High School in Cathedral City, California. Some students in the eastside are zoned to La Quinta High School and Colonel Mitchell Paige Middle School.

The Riverside County Department of Education operates San Cayetano Community School, a grade 1 to 12 educational facility. Palm Desert has 8 private schools in the immediate area: Desert Adventist Academy, Palm Desert Presbyterian School, Sacred Heart Catholic Academy, The Palm Valley School, the Learning Tree Academy, Xavier College Preparatory High School (Catholic-Jesuit), the Hope Academy, and the Desert Torah Academy, a Jewish community school and its social recreational Jewish Community Center. It also has meetings by the Jewish Federation of the Desert based in Palm Springs, serving an estimated 35,000 Jewish people in the Coachella Valley.

Infrastructure

Utilities
Electricity in Palm Desert is served by Southern California Edison.

Transportation
Modern transportation services include:
 Palm Springs International Airport serves Palm Springs and the Coachella Valley.
 Historical note: during World War II it was operated as the Palm Springs Army Airfield.
 SunLine Transit Agency provides bus service in the Coachella Valley.

Highways include:
 – Interstate 10 runs north of the city.
 – The Pines to Palms Scenic Byway (California State Route 74) runs from the coast, over the San Jacinto Mountains and has its eastern terminus at Highway 111 in Palm Desert before continuing northbound as Monterey Avenue.
 – California State Route 111, which passes through the city.

Parks 
Palm Desert has 14 city parks:

 Cahuilla Hills Park
 Cap Homme/ Ralph Adams Park
 Civic Center Park
 Community Gardens
 Freedom Park
 Hovley Soccer Park
 Ironwood Park
 Joe Mann Park
 Magnesia Falls City Park
 Palm Desert Dog Park
 Palma Village Park
 University Dog Park
 University Park East
 Washington Charter School Park

South of Palm Desert is the Santa Rosa and San Jacinto Mountains National Monument, and north of Palm Desert is the Coachella Valley National Wildlife Refuge.

Cemeteries
The Desert Memorial Park in Cathedral City is maintained by the Palm Springs Cemetery District. Also in Cathedral City is the Forest Lawn Cemetery, maintained by Forest Lawn Memorial-Parks & Mortuaries.

Culture 
 Desert ARC Italian Festival
 Greek Festival
 Armenian Festival
 CanadaFest
 Scottish Festival

Attractions
 Palm Desert
College of the Desert
 Philip L. Boyd Deep Canyon Desert Research Center, a unit of the University of California Natural Reserve System
 Living Desert Zoo and Gardens
 McCallum Theatre
 Circle of Land and Sky temporary art installation by Phillip K. Smith III, part of the inaugural Desert X
 Surrounding communities
 Children's Discovery Museum of the Desert in Rancho Mirage.
 Indian Wells Tennis Garden in Indian Wells.

Notable people

Many celebrities keep homes in Palm Desert, including Rita Rudner and more recently, the current home of professional golfer Michelle Wie and one of the homes of Bill Gates. Legendary actress Anne Francis resided in a condominium until July, 2000. Film producer Jerry Weintraub called it his second home before he died. Artist Phillip K. Smith III calls Palm Desert home and his studio is in Palm Desert.

The city is home to the Palm Desert Scene, a musical genre that has been heavily influential internationally since the early 1990s. Many of the Palm Desert bands are credited for starting the rock/metal subgenre known as stoner rock. Bands including Queens of the Stone Age, Kyuss, Fu Manchu and Eagles of Death Metal have become well known rock bands.

Sister cities
Palm Desert had been in the sister cities program, as designated by Sister Cities International. Six to nine cities that are or were associated with Palm Desert:
 Wollongong, New South Wales, Australia
 Osoyoos, British Columbia, Canada
 Haifa, Israel
 La Paz, Baja California Sur, Mexico
 Gisborne, New Zealand
 Port Moresby, Papua New Guinea
 Port Elizabeth, South Africa
 Zihuatanejo, Guerrero, Mexico

Palm Desert has a community exchange program with
 Ketchikan, Alaska, U.S.

Also a community exchange relationship with the major city of Concepcion, Chile.

See also

 List of public art in Palm Desert, California
 St. Margaret's Episcopal Church

References

Further reading

External links

 
 Palm Desert Chamber of Commerce
 

  

 
1973 establishments in California
Cities in Riverside County, California
Coachella Valley
Incorporated cities and towns in California
Populated places established in 1943
Populated places established in 1973
Populated places in the Colorado Desert